In Greek mythology, Onchestos or Onchestus (Ancient Greek: Ογχηστός) was the eponymous founder of the city of Onchestus in Boeotia, where the Onchestian Poseidon had a temple and a statue.

Family 
Little is known about Onchestos and only two literary sources (Plutarch in Quaestiones Graecae and Pausanias in Description of Greece) gave information about him. In these accounts, he was described as the Boeotian son of Poseidon and father of Megareus and Abrota, wife of King Nisos. Onchestus's son and son-in-law were listed as kings of Megara.

In some traditions, Onchestus was called the son of Boeotus.

Mythology

Plutarch's account

Pausanias' account

Grove of Onchestus 
In ancient times the city of Onchestus was famous for its sanctuary of Poseidon and is mentioned in the famous "Catalogue of Ships" in Homer's Iliad where it is referred to as the god's "bright grove."

In the Homeric Hymns to Apollo the grove is also mentioned:

Notes

References 

 Homer, The Iliad with an English Translation by A.T. Murray, Ph.D. in two volumes. Cambridge, MA., Harvard University Press; London, William Heinemann, Ltd. 1924. . Online version at the Perseus Digital Library.
 Homer, Homeri Opera in five volumes. Oxford, Oxford University Press. 1920. . Greek text available at the Perseus Digital Library.
 Lucius Mestrius Plutarchus, Moralia with an English Translation by Frank Cole Babbitt. Cambridge, MA. Harvard University Press. London. William Heinemann Ltd. 1936. Online version at the Perseus Digital Library. Greek text available from the same website.
 Pausanias, Description of Greece with an English Translation by W.H.S. Jones, Litt.D., and H.A. Ormerod, M.A., in 4 Volumes. Cambridge, MA, Harvard University Press; London, William Heinemann Ltd. 1918. . Online version at the Perseus Digital Library
 Pausanias, Graeciae Descriptio. 3 vols. Leipzig, Teubner. 1903.  Greek text available at the Perseus Digital Library.

Boeotian characters in Greek mythology